Augustana College  may refer to:

Augustana College (Illinois)
Augustana University Sioux Falls, South Dakota
Augustana University College, Alberta

See also
Augustana Divinity School (Neuendettelsau), Bavaria, Germany